Papurana jimiensis is a species of true frog. It is endemic to the mountains of central and western New Guinea in both Indonesia and Papua New Guinea. The common name Jimi River frog has been coined for it.

It inhabits mountain streams and nearby areas, and can also be found in degraded habitats.

Papurana jimiensis is an uncommon species, although it is under-recorded. It is collected for food, but this probably does not constitute a threat, as long as collection is for local consumption only. It occurs in the Jimi River Wildlife Management Area.

References

jimiensis
Amphibians of New Guinea
Amphibians of Western New Guinea
Amphibians of Papua New Guinea
Taxa named by Michael J. Tyler
Amphibians described in 1963